Anne-Marie Homolle (1912-2006), was a French botanist noted for studying and collecting plants of Madagascar. 
She identified at least 260 species of plants native to Madagascar, and two genera were named in her honor: Homollea (in the family Rubiaceae) and Homolliella (now a synonym of Paracephaelis Baill. ).

References 

1912 births
1988 deaths
20th-century French botanists
20th-century French women scientists
French expatriates in Madagascar